Michael Andrew Johnston (born 19 April 1999) is a professional footballer who plays as a winger for Primeira Liga club Vitória Guimarães, on loan from Celtic. Born in Glasgow, Johnston represented Scotland in youth internationals up to and including the under-21 level. In March 2023 he changed his international allegiance so that he could play for the Republic of Ireland.

Early life
Michael Andrew Johnston was born on 19 April 1999 in Glasgow.

Club career
Johnston made his first-team debut for Celtic on 6 May 2017, in a 4–1 victory over St Johnstone at Celtic Park. Shortly after the game, the winger signed a new three-year contract with his boyhood club.

In November 2018, Johnston signed a contract with Celtic to run until the end of the 2022–23 season. In the following month, Johnston scored his first goal for the club in a 3–0 win against Motherwell.

On 28 November 2019, Johnston scored in a 3–0 victory against Ligue 1 team Stade Rennais in the UEFA Europa League. Johnston signed a new five-year contract with Celtic on 28 December 2019.

Johnston's Celtic career has been disrupted by numerous injuries, which had seen him miss much of the 2019–20 and 2020–21 Scottish Premiership seasons. He subsequently found opportunities rare during the 2021–22 campaign with arrivals Jota, Liel Abada and Daizen Maeda ahead of Johnston in the pecking order for his position.

During the summer of 2022, manager Ange Postecoglou confirmed that Celtic would look to loan Johnston out for more regular game time, commenting that: "There's definitely a talented footballer there, but sometimes you just need a different environment to help that happen". Belgian Pro League club Standard Liège (managed by former Celtic head coach Ronny Deila) were reportedly interested in his services, along with Scottish Premiership side Hibernian. On 2 September 2022, Johnston went on a season-long loan to Primeira Liga side Vitória de Guimarães. He also signed a one year extension to his current Celtic deal prior to the move. On 15 October 2022, Johnston scored his first goal and brace for Vitória S.C. in a 3–1 Taça de Portugal win against CF Canelas 2010. On 31 October 2022, Johnston scored his first league goal in a 3–2 home win against Famalicão.

International career
Johnston was born in Glasgow and represented Scotland in youth internationals. Selected for the Scotland under-21 squad in the 2018 Toulon Tournament, the team lost to Turkey in a penalty-out and finished fourth. He was voted third best player and selected in the Best tournament XI.

Johnston is eligible to play for the Republic of Ireland, through his grandfather who was born in Derry. Ireland manager Stephen Kenny confirmed in March 2023 that the FAI had applied for permission to select Johnston. It was then confirmed by the FAI the same month that the application had been approved by FIFA, and he was selected for their squad later that month.

Career statistics

Honours
Celtic
Scottish Premiership: 2018–19, 2019–20, 2021–22
Scottish Cup: 2018–19, 2019–20,
Scottish League Cup: 2019–20, 2021–22

Individual
Toulon Tournament Bronze Ball: 2018
Best XI - 2018 Toulon Tournament

References

External links

1999 births
Living people
Footballers from Glasgow
Scottish footballers
Association football wingers
Celtic F.C. players
Scottish Professional Football League players
Scotland youth international footballers
Scotland under-21 international footballers
Scottish expatriate footballers
Expatriate footballers in Portugal
Scottish expatriate sportspeople in Portugal
People educated at St Ninian's High School, Kirkintilloch
Scottish people of Irish descent